Kenya Technical Trainers College is a Nairobi institution of higher learning. It providesTechnical and Vocational Education and Training (TVET).
Kenya Technical Trainers College has since 2020, started training of trainers only and transferred all other students to different colleges around.

Location 

Kenya Technical Trainers College is located in the Gigiri area of Nairobi, along Limuru Road and next to the United Nations Office. A controversial proposal by the Government of Kenya would relocate the college to the Kenya Science Campus of University of Nairobi.

Teacher education programs

Certificate courses
 Instructor Training Part I
 Instructor Training part II
 Certificate in Management of TVET institution
 Training of Trainers courses

Diploma courses
 Diploma in Technical Teacher Education  (mathematics/business studies)
 Diploma in Technical Teacher Education(Mixed-mode)
 Diploma in Technical Teacher Education with ICT
 Diploma in Instructor Training
 Diploma in Technical Teacher Education (Mechanical Engineering) Pre-service

Higher and advanced diploma courses
 Higher Diploma in Education Management (KNEC)
 Advanced Diploma in Technical Education

Non-teacher education programs
All non-teacher education programs were suspended as from 2020

Student Body
The student body, represented by the Students of Kenya Technical Trainers College Organisation (SKETTCO). In 2018, John Koech received re-election as finance minister of the SKETTCO.
The college also has a body of student's representatives (SRC)-Student representative council, headed by Edwin Segera in 2020,
some of the members of SRC(2020) include John Kairegi, Benjami Africa, Douglas Juma, Lawrence Karanja Muturi, Brilliant Kibende, Sharon Moenga ...

See also
 List of universities and colleges in Kenya

References
 Koech John Cheruiyot Skettco cabinet secretary for finance 2017/2018
0724845011

External links
 Kenya Technical Trainers College official website

Universities and colleges in Kenya
Educational institutions established in 1978
1978 establishments in Kenya